Bin of Cullen or Bin Hill (Scottish Gaelic: Am Binnean) is a hill in Moray, Scotland directly inland from Findochty. Bin of Cullen is 320 m in height and visible from considerable distances, such as Longman Hill to the east and Lossiemouth to the West.
There was formerly a large cairn at the top of the hill but in 2002 this mysteriously disappeared.

Line notes

References
 United Kingdom Ordnance Survey (2004) Landranger 1:50,000
 C.Michael Hogan  (2008) Longman Hill, The Modern Antiquarian
 

Mountains and hills of Moray
Marilyns of Scotland